César Abaya (born 12 October 1984) is a Chadian professional football player who plays for a club AS SONIDEP and the Chad national team.

Career
Abaya plays the right-back position. He can, however, play left-back and centre-back positions. 
Before joining AS SONIDEP in 2018, he played for Renaissance, Gazelle, Foullah and Mangasport.

International career
Abaya has 14 FIFA official matches, and 9 unofficial matches for Chad.

See also
 List of Chad international footballers

References

External links
 

1984 births
Living people
Chadian footballers
Chad international footballers
Renaissance FC players
Gazelle FC players
Foullah Edifice FC players
AS Mangasport players
AS SONIDEP players
Association football defenders
Chadian expatriate footballers
Expatriate footballers in Gabon
Chadian expatriate sportspeople in Gabon
Expatriate footballers in Niger